Ally Wollaston (born 4 January 2001) is a New Zealand professional track racing cyclist and road cyclist riding for .

Early life
Wollaston got into cycling through her family as they were helping out with the St Peter's School Cycling Team.
Wollaston was educated at St Peter's School, and is currently a law student at the University of Waikato.

Career
Wollaston was part of the New Zealand team that won the team pursuit race in Hong Kong as part of the 2019–20 UCI Track Cycling World Cup. She also won gold in the individual pursuit at the 2019 UCI Junior Track Cycling World Championships.

In January 2022, Wollaston won the National criterium championships. She then went to join her team in Europe and got her first win for the team at the Grand Prix du Morbihan on 14 May 2022.

Wollaston was selected to represent New Zealand at the 2022 Commonwealth Games. However, she crashed and injured her wrist during stage two of the 2022 Tour de France Femmes, and was unable to compete at the Commonwealth Games.

Major results
Sources:

Road

2018
 National Junior Road Championships
1st  Road race
2nd Time trial
2019
 National Junior Road Championships
1st  Road race
4th Time trial
2020
 National U23 Road Championships
3rd Road race
4th Time trial
 6th Elite National Championships Road race
2021
 5th Overall Watersley Womens Challenge
2022
 1st  Under-23 National Road race Championships
 1st Grand Prix du Morbihan Féminin
 2nd Elite National Championships Road race
 3rd Overall Bretagne Ladies Tour
 3rd Overall Belgium Tour
1st  Points classification
1st Stage 1 
 10th La Classique Morbihan
2023
 1st Schwalbe Classic 
 1st  National Criterium Championships - New Zealand 
 1st  Under-23 National Time trial Championships
 1st  Elite National Road race Championships

Track
2019
 1st Team Pursuit (Hong Kong) 2019–20 UCI Track Cycling World Cup

References

External links

2001 births
Living people
People educated at St Peter's School, Cambridge
New Zealand female cyclists
New Zealand track cyclists
People from Cambridge, New Zealand
21st-century New Zealand women